The Dimension Data Ladies Pro-Am is a women's professional golf tournament held in Western Cape, South Africa. It is an event on the Southern Africa-based Sunshine Ladies Tour since 2014, played concurrently with the men's Dimension Data Pro-Am on the Sunshine Tour.

The professional golfers are teamed with an amateur and together they compete for the Dimension Data Ladies Pro-Am trophy. They compete using the Better Ball Medal scoring system with the amateur handicaps taken into account.

Except for 2015 when the event was hosted at Oubaai Golf Resort & Spa, the tournament has been played over three days on two different golf courses, the first two rounds at George Golf Club, with the third and final round at Fancourt Hotel and Country Club.

In 2021 the tournament had a revised format, without the pro-am element, in observance of the coronavirus health protocols and restrictions. The ladies field did not play at the George Golf Club but joined the men playing the Outeniqua and Montagu courses at Fancourt on alternating days for the first and second rounds, before playing the final round at the Outeniqua as per previous years.

Winners
Individual

Team event

See also
Dimension Data Pro-Am

References

External links
Coverage on the Sunshine Ladies Tour's official site

Sunshine Ladies Tour events
Golf tournaments in South Africa